The 1985 Japan Series was the 36th edition of Nippon Professional Baseball's postseason championship series. It matched the Central League champion Hanshin Tigers against the Pacific League champion Seibu Lions. Making their first appearance in the Japan Series since 1964, the Tigers finally won their first Japan Series championship.  To this day, it remains the only Japan Series title won by the Tigers.

Summary

Matchups

Game 1

Game 2

Game 3

Game 4

Game 5

Game 6

See also
1985 World Series
Curse of the Colonel

References

Japan Series
Hanshin Tigers
Seibu Lions
Japan Series, 1985
Japan Series
Japan Series
Japan Series